Vaughtia babingtoni is a species of sea snail, a marine gastropod mollusk in the family Muricidae, the murex snails or rock snails.

Description
The length of the shell attains 15 mm, its maximum diameter 8 mm.

This species is similar in sculpture to Vaughtia scrobiculata, from which it differs considerably in form, the spire being long and turreted, and the rostrum elongated and slightly recurved. In form the shell is somewhat similar to the British Trophonopsis muricata (Montagu, 1803)

Distribution
This marine species occurs on the Agulhas Bank, South Africa.

References

 Turton, W. H. (1932). Marine Shells of Port Alfred, South Africa. Humphrey Milford, London, xvi + 331 pp., 70 pls.
 Steyn, D.G. & Lussi, M. (1998) Marine Shells of South Africa. An Illustrated Collector's Guide to Beached Shells. Ekogilde Publishers, Hartebeespoort, South Africa, ii + 264 pp.
 Lussi M. (2012) Description of three new species of Vaughtia from off the Eastern Cape, South Africa with a revision of the genus (Gastropoda: Prosobranchia: Muricidae) from Southern Madagascar. Malacologia Mostra Mondiale 76: 5-13
 Houart, R.; Kilburn, R. N. & Marais, A. P. (2010). Muricidae. pp. 176-270, in: Marais A.P. & Seccombe A.D. (eds), Identification guide to the seashells of South Africa. Volume 1. Groenkloof: Centre for Molluscan Studies. 376 pp

External links
 Barnard, K.H. (1969) Contributions to the knowledge of South African marine Mollusca. Part VI. Supplement. Annals of the South African Museum, 47: 595–661, 2 pls.

babingtoni
Gastropods described in 1892